William Morgan was an English politician in the 16th Century.

Rythe was born in Chilworth, Surrey. He was a landowner and commander of the local musters. Morgan was M.P. for Haslemere from 1586 to 1587. He died on 10 December 1602 and is buried on St Martha's Hill.

References

People from London
1525 births
1602 deaths
English MPs 1586–1587